Pat Somerville (born April 11, 1980) is an American politician from Michigan. Somerville was a member of the Michigan House of Representatives from District 23.

Early life 
On April 11, 1980, Somerville was born in Dearborn, Michigan. Somerville's grandmother was Patricia Anne Somerville, former mayor of Rochester Hills, Michigan.

Education 
In 2003, Somerville earned a Bachelor of Science degree in Aerospace Engineering from the University of Michigan.

Career 
Somerville was a manager at Walgreens.

In 2009, Somerville served as the chairman of the Wayne County Young Republicans.

On November 2, 2010, Somerville won the election and became a Republican member of Michigan House of Representatives for District 23. Somerville defeated Deb Kennedy with 53.44% of the votes. On November 6, 2012, as an incumbent, Somerville won the election and continued serving District 23. Somerville defeated Tom Boritzski with 50.49% of the votes. On November 4, 2014, as an incumbent, Somerville won the election and continued serving District 23. Somerville defeated David Haener with 52.12% of the votes.

Somerville represented part of the Down River area of Wayne County. His district includes Grosse Isle, Brownstown Township, Gibraltar, Trenton, Woodhaven and Huron Township.

References

External links 
State House bio of Somerville
 Pat Somerville at ballotpedia.org

1980 births
University of Michigan alumni
Members of the Michigan House of Representatives
Living people
21st-century American politicians